Thitarodes renzhiensis is a species of moth of the family Hepialidae. It was described by Yang et al. in 1991, and is known from Yunnan, China.

References

External links
Hepialidae genera

Moths described in 1991
Hepialidae